Van Vloten is a Dutch patrician family from  Vleuten.

History
The oldest known family member is one Meindert Cornelisz van der Haer (later van Vloten), who was a carpenter in Utrecht and died in 1666. The families with the surnames Van Bommel van Vloten, Van Braam van Vloten, Gaaikema van Vloten and Stael van Holstein van Vloten are branches of the van Vloten family.

Notable members
 Johannes van Vloten (1740–1809), Dutch theologician, father of:
 Martha van Vloten (1857–1943), wife of Frederik van Eeden
 Betsy van Vloten (1862–1946), wife of Willem Witsen
 Gerlof van Vloten 1866–1903), Dutch writer and translator, editor of the Arabic encyclopedia Kitāb Mafātīḥ al-ʿulūm
 Kitty van Vloten (1867–1945), wife of Albert Verwey
 Anton August van Vloten (1864–1920), Dutch businessman and politician
 Prof. Dr. Willem Anton van Vloten (born 1941), Dutch dermatologist

Family coat of arms

The family coat of arms consists of a green cloverleaf in a silver field, accompanied by three doves of natural color.

Literature
  Nederland´s Patriciaat 5th edition. Centraal Bureau voor de Genealogie 1914
  Nederland’s Patriciaat 88th edition. Centraal Bureau voor de Genealogie 2007/’08
  Stokvis, Pieter.; Uuden, Cornelie van. De gezusters van Vloten. De vrouwen achter Frederik van Eeden, Willem Witsen en Albert Verwey. Uitgeverij Bert Bakker. Amsterdam 2007

References

External links

Dutch families
Dutch patrician families